The 2022 bombing of Kryvyi Rih is a series of artillery fire and air raids carried out by the Russian occupiers in the city of Kryvyi Rih during the invasion of Ukraine in 2022.

Course of events

February 
On February 24, 2022, military warehouses of the 17th tank brigade in Kryvyi Rih near the Makulan microdistrict were fired upon.

April 
On April 7, there were three shellings on the territory of Dnipropetrovsk Oblast during the day. The occupiers struck the Synelnykove and Kryvyi Rih districts. It is known about four dead. Seven were injured. Two citizens went missing. A rocket also hit a private residential  sector in Kryvyi Rih. One person was injured.

On April 18, Russians attacked the Kryvyi Rih District, there are victims and dead.

July 
On July 25, at 2 a.m., the Metallurgical District of Kryvyi Rih was shelled with cluster munitions from the Russian Tornado-S MLRS. It is stated that there were no victims.

September 
On September 3, the settlement community of Shyroke came under fire in the Kryvyi Rih District. Many houses were destroyed. There was no victims.

On September 8, Russian troops tried to launch a missile attack on Kryvyi Rih, but the missile was destroyed in the sky by Ukrainian air defense forces.

On 14 September, at around 17:00, Russia carried out a missile attack on Kryvyi Rih, firing at least 7 Iskander and Kinjal missiles at the city.  6 of which struck in the area of the Karachuns Reservoir.  After the missile attack, the water level in the Inhulets River rose by 1–2 meters, as a result of which 112 private cottages were flooded. As a result of the missile attack, there were interruptions in water supply in several areas of the city in Kryvyi Rih.  In addition, about 5,000 residents of the Sofiivka settlement community were left without water supply and 7,000 residents of the Lozuvatka village community. At midnight, on 15 September, the head of the military administration of Kryvyi Rih, Oleksandr Vilkul, announced the partial evacuation of two adjacent districts of Kryvyi Rih due to the rise of the water level in the Inhulets River to a historical maximum. Emergency services had to carry out two controlled bursts on the dam downstream to increase the carrying capacity of the Inhulets River and lower the water level. By 16 September, the water in the Inhulets turned red.  Media speculated that this was the result of a change in the course of the river and its flow on clay soils.  The sluice gates of the dam, which was hit by a missile, were covered with loam and rubble. In addition, water supply was stabilized in Kryvyi Rih. The head of the Dnipropetrovsk gay state administration, Valentin Reznichenko, said that in the afternoon of September 16, the Russians struck another blow at the critical infrastructure, as a result of which hydrotechnical structures suffered serious destruction.  The Minister of Environmental Protection and Natural Resources of Ukraine, Ruslan Strelets, said that the destruction of the hydrotechnical protective structure of the Karachuns Reservoir could cause a man-made catastrophe with serious consequences for the environment and people.

On September 26, the Russians fired Kh-59 missiles at Kryvyi Rih International Airport, damaging its infrastructure.

Reactions
As a result of the shelling of the Karachunivske Reservoir, the President of Ukraine, Volodymyr Zelenskyy, stated that Russia attempted to flood Kryvyi Rih:

The head of the military administration of Kryvyi Rih, Oleksandr Vilkul, also stated about the Russians' attempt to flood Kryvyi Rih:

The Institute for the Study of War said that Russia launched a missile attack on the dam to deter a counteroffensive by the Ukrainian Armed Forces in southern Ukraine, preventing future operations by the Armed Forces of Ukraine on the Inhulets.

References

History of Kryvyi Rih
Airstrikes during the 2022 Russian invasion of Ukraine
Russian war crimes in Ukraine
War crimes during the 2022 Russian invasion of Ukraine